Gilberton is a place name used in several English-speaking countries.

In Australia:
Gilberton, Queensland (Etheridge Shire)
Gilberton, Queensland (Gold Coast)
Gilberton, South Australia

In the United States:
Gilberton, Pennsylvania

Other uses:
 Gilberton (publisher)